James Archie Johnson Jr. (September 10, 1912 – November 27, 2004) was an American football, basketball, and baseball player, coach, and college athletics administrator.  He was tapped to reintroduce men's sports to East Carolina after World War II.  He was the seventh head coach of the football, basketball and baseball teams at East Carolina Teachers College. He also was the athletic director for all sports teams. Before coaching, Johnson was a 16 letter winning athlete between 1933 and 1937. Johnson was inducted in 1978 into the ECU Hall of Fame.

"12th Man Tackle"
In October 1977, William & Mary met heavily favored East Carolina University in the Oyster Bowl. In the third quarter ECU led by three points. With 3:15 left in the third quarter, William & Mary quarterback Tom Rozantz broke loose and ran for the end zone. Jim Johnson, described by The Virginian Pilot as "a portly 65-year-old gentleman in a raincoat", ran from the sidelines and threw a block tackle on Rozantz before he could score the winning touchdown. The unusual turn of events silenced the screaming William & Mary fans, and the officials gathered to discuss their course of action. After deliberation, the play was ruled a touchdown.

Head coaching record

Football

References

1912 births
2004 deaths
American football tackles
American men's basketball players
East Carolina Pirates athletic directors
East Carolina Pirates baseball coaches
East Carolina Pirates baseball players
East Carolina Pirates football coaches
East Carolina Pirates football players
East Carolina Pirates men's basketball coaches
East Carolina Pirates men's basketball players
Players of American football from North Carolina
Basketball coaches from North Carolina
Basketball players from North Carolina